The Maleae (incorrectly Pyreae) are the apple tribe in the rose family, Rosaceae. The group includes a number of plants bearing commercially important fruits, such as apples and pears, while others are cultivated as ornamentals. Older taxonomies separated some of this group as tribe Crataegeae, as the Cydonia group (a tentative placement), or some genera were placed in family Quillajaceae.

The tribe consists exclusively of shrubs and small trees. Most have pomes, a type of accessory fruit that does not occur in other Rosaceae. All except Vauquelinia (with 15 chromosomes) have a basal haploid chromosome count of 17, instead of 7, 8, or 9 as in the other Rosaceae.

There are approximately 28 genera that contain about 1100 species worldwide, with most species occurring in the temperate Northern Hemisphere.

Nomenclature 
The name Maleae is required by the International Code of Nomenclature for algae, fungi, and plants (article 19), for any group at the tribal level that includes the genus Malus, but not either of the genera Rosa or Amygdalus.

Current classification

Core members of the group
A traditional circumscription of Maleae includes the following genera:

Amelanchier - serviceberry, juneberry, saskatoon, sugarplum
Aria (see Sorbus)
Aronia - chokeberry
Chaenomeles - Japanese quince
Chamaemeles
Chamaemespilus (see Sorbus chamaemespilus)
Cormus (see Sorbus)
Cydonia - quince
Dichotomanthes
Docynia
Docyniopsis
Eriobotrya -loquat
Eriolobus
Hesperomeles
Heteromeles - toyon
Malacomeles - false serviceberry
Malus - apple, crabapple
Osteomeles
Peraphyllum - wild crab apple, squaw apple
Photinia
Pseudocydonia - Chinese quince
Pyrus - pear
Rhaphiolepis - hawthorn
Sorbus - rowan, whitebeam, service tree
Stranvaesia
Torminalis (see Sorbus torminalis)

intergeneric hybrids:
× Amelasorbus
× Malosorbus
× Sorbaronia
× Sorbopyrus

and graft hybrids:
+ Pyrocydonia (Pirocydonia)

Tribe Crataegeae 
A recent taxonomic treatment includes the following genera in Maleae that were earlier separated as tribe Crataegeae (or as intertribe hybrids):

Cotoneaster - cotoneaster
Crataegus - hawthorn
Mespilus - medlar
Pyracantha - firethorn

intergeneric (including intertribal) hybrids:
× Crataemespilus
× Crataegosorbus
× Sorbocotoneaster

and the graft hybrid:
+ Crataegomespilus

Former members of family Quillajaceae 
The following genera were previously placed in tribe Quillajeae in Rosaceae, or in family Quillajaceae. Their fruit are dry capsules, not pomes.
 Kageneckia
 Vauquelinia
 Lindleya

The Cydonia group 
The Cydonia group within the Maloid Rosaceae was a tentative grouping of pome-fruited genera with many ovules (rather than just two) per carpel. The genera involved were:
 Cydonia
 Chaenomeles
 Docynia
 Pseudocydonia

It is not yet clear whether this group is monophyletic within the Maleae. Molecular data indicate a close relationship between Cydonia and Pseudocydonia. Multiple ovules per carpel also occur in Kageneckia, a non-pome-bearing genus. Chloroplast DNA analysis, but not nuclear DNA, shows a tight relationship between Cydonia and Dichotomanthes, a non-pome-bearing genus.

References

External links

 
Rosales tribes